Bakindick Mandinka   is a town in western Gambia. It is located in Lower Niumi District in the North Bank Division.  As of 2008, it has an estimated population of 1,801.

References

External links
Satellite map at Maplandia

Populated places in the Gambia
Lower Niumi